Life and Love or Life and Love may refer to:
 Life & Love, a 1978 album by Demis Roussos
 Life and Love (Leon Russell album), 1979
 Life and Love, a 1998 album by Philip Bailey